Serge Buttet (14 December 1954 – 24 June 2021) was a French butterfly swimmer. He competed in the men's 100 metre butterfly at the 1976 Summer Olympics.

References

External links
 

1954 births
2021 deaths
French male butterfly swimmers
Olympic swimmers of France
Swimmers at the 1976 Summer Olympics
Place of birth missing
20th-century French people
21st-century French people